Rocky Run (also known as Rocky Run Creek) is a tributary of the Susquehanna River in Luzerne County, Pennsylvania, in the United States. In the early 1900s, the stream had a high level of water quality and was proposed for use as a water supply. The construction of a dam on it was proposed, but no formal plans were ever made. There are coal mines in the watershed, but they have been abandoned since the late 1800s. Wisconsinan Till, Wisconsinan Ice-Contact Stratified Drift, Boulder Colluvium, Wisconsinan Bouldery Till, coal dumps, and bedrock consisting of sandstone and shale all occur in the watershed. The drainage basin is designated as a Coldwater Fishery.

Course
Rocky Run begins in a deep valley between Lee Mountain and another mountain in Salem Township. It flows east for several tenths of a mile before turning slightly northeast. After some distance, it loses its flow, but continues eastward. It runs alongside Rocky Run Road for a short distance before crossing US Route 11 and reaching its confluence with the Susquehanna River at the community of Dogtown.

Hydrology
In 1909, the discharge of Rocky Run was measured by the Pennsylvania Department of Health to be 170,000 gallons per day. The minimum discharge at that time was 90,000 gallons per day.

In the early 1900s, the concentration of total solids in the waters of Rocky Run was measured to be 180 parts per million. The concentration of chlorine was 3.48 parts per million. The calcium sulfate concentration was 19 parts per million, the silica concentration was 8 parts per million, the concentration of magnesium carbonate was 4.5 parts per million, and the concentration of iron oxide and aluminum oxide was 2 parts per million. The concentration of temporary water hardness was 4.7 parts per million and the concentration of permanent water hardness was 11.2 parts per million.

A 1911 report by the Pennsylvania Department of Health stated that waters of Rocky Run were "of excellent quality in every respect".

Geography and geology

The valley of Rocky Run is situated to the north of Lee Mountain.

A 1911 report mentioned two tunnels leading from the mine and entering loose rocks on a hillside. The report noted that the tunnels had a low discharge and their waters were slightly acidic and stated that during rainy conditions they might drain into Rocky Run.

The watershed of Rocky Run has experienced glaciation. A meltwater sluiceway with a depth of  cuts through the Little Shickshinny-Rocky Run divide between the valleys of Rocky Run and Little Shickshinny Creek.

The surficial geology in the vicinity of Rocky Run mostly consists of a glacial or resedimented till known as Wisconsinan Till. Wisconsinan Ice-Contact Stratified Drift, which contains stratified sand and gravel as well as some boulders, also occurs in the valley, as does alluvium. Boulder Colluvium and Wisconsinan Bouldery Till occur to the north of the stream and Wisconsinan Bouldery Till also occurs in the southeastern part of the watershed. Coal dumps, or large piles of coal waste, occur in some small areas in the watershed. In the watershed's northernmost and southernmost reaches, the surficial geology features bedrock consisting of sandstone and shale.

Watershed
The stream is entirely within the United States Geological Survey quadrangle of Shickshinny. The stream is  downriver of Shickshinny.

A 1911 report described the watershed of Rocky Run as being heavily wooded. The stream was described as flowing "virtually unseen" through a forest in the 1978 Luzerne County Critical Areas Inventory. Part of the stream is in Pennsylvania State Game Lands Number 260. The watershed is in the Wyoming Valley.

History
Rocky Run was entered into the Geographic Names Information System on August 2, 1979. Its identifier in the Geographic Names Information System is 1185367.

In the early 1900s, Rocky Run was considered for use as a water supply for the Insane Hospital and Almshouse in Retreat, Pennsylvania, on the opposite side of the river in Newport Township. The Pennsylvania Department of Health stated that the use of the stream as a water supply would "not be prejudicial to public health".

In the 1800s, there were coal mines in the watershed of Rocky Run. The mines were known as the Rocky Run Mines or the Shickshinny Mines. They were opened by Nathan Beach and ownership of them passed to Nathan Beach Crary in 1858. They were also leased to Jesse Beadle for a short time. The mines were abandoned by the 1890s. The stream was historically used along with Paddy Run as an industrial water supply for the E.E. Stackhouse Coal Company.

Biology
The entire drainage basin of Rocky Run is designated as a Coldwater Fishery and a Migratory Fishery.

Hemlock forests surround Rocky Run. A number of very old trees have been discovered along the stream.

See also
Little Wapwallopen Creek, next tributary of the Susquehanna River going upriver
Turtle Creek (Susquehanna River), next tributary of the Susquehanna River going downriver
List of rivers of Pennsylvania

References

Rivers of Luzerne County, Pennsylvania
Tributaries of the Susquehanna River
Rivers of Pennsylvania